Bajram Haliti (21 May 1955 – 18 July 2022) was a Romani author from Kosovo. His books have won many awards, including several prizes in the annual "Amico Rom" contest in Italy and his work was included in 1998's The Roads of Roma: A PEN Anthology of Gypsy Writers. A polyglot who has lectured throughout Europe and the United States, he served as the editor of the magazine Ahimsa ("Nonviolence"), devoted to Romani and Serbian issues.

References 

1955 births
2022 deaths
Kosovan non-fiction writers
Kosovan poets
Romani writers
Kosovan Romani people
Kosovan journalists
People from Gjilan